This page gathers the results of elections in Sicily.

Regional elections

Latest regional election

List of previous regional elections
1947 Sicilian regional election
1951 Sicilian regional election
1955 Sicilian regional election
1959 Sicilian regional election
1963 Sicilian regional election
1967 Sicilian regional election
1971 Sicilian regional election
1976 Sicilian regional election
1981 Sicilian regional election
1986 Sicilian regional election
1991 Sicilian regional election
1996 Sicilian regional election
2001 Sicilian regional election
2006 Sicilian regional election
2008 Sicilian regional election
2012 Sicilian regional election
2017 Sicilian regional election

Italian general elections in Sicily

Latest general election

List of previous general elections
1946 Italian general election in Sicily
1948 Italian general election in Sicily
1953 Italian general election in Sicily
1958 Italian general election in Sicily
1963 Italian general election in Sicily
1968 Italian general election in Sicily
1972 Italian general election in Sicily
1976 Italian general election in Sicily
1979 Italian general election in Sicily
1983 Italian general election in Sicily
1987 Italian general election in Sicily
1992 Italian general election in Sicily
1994 Italian general election in Sicily
1996 Italian general election in Sicily
2001 Italian general election in Sicily
2006 Italian general election in Sicily
2008 Italian general election in Sicily
2013 Italian general election in Sicily

European Parliament elections in Sicily

Latest European Parliament election

List of previous European Parliament elections
1979 European Parliament election in Sicily
1984 European Parliament election in Sicily
1989 European Parliament election in Sicily
1994 European Parliament election in Sicily
1999 European Parliament election in Sicily
2004 European Parliament election in Sicily
2009 European Parliament election in Sicily

References

 
Politics of Sicily